Alexânia is a municipality in central Goiás state, Brazil.  Alexânia is known for its alleged extraterrestrial sightings in the late sixties and early seventies.  The Areias River passes through the municipality.

Location
It is located on the main Brasília–Goiânia highway, GO-060, which has been recently widened to four lanes.  The distance to Brasília is 130 km and 118 km to Goiânia.  It is part of the Entorno do Distrito Federal statistical micro-region.
Municipal boundaries are with:
North: Corumbá de Goiás
South: Abadiânia
East: Santo Antônio do Descoberto
West: Corumbá de Goiás and Abadiânia

Districts, Villages, and Hamlets
Villages: Alvorada, Olhos d’Água and Estiva.
Hamlet: Serra do Ouro.

Economy
The city relies on agriculture and livestock raising, with ranches producing both meat and dairy cattle.  There is a substantial poultry industry with 755,000 birds counted in 2006.  There is also an intense commercial activity because of the highway traffic. Alexânia is also an important cluster of ‘Cachaça de alambique’ (artisanal sugar cane rum). The major ones are: Cambeba, Cachaça do Ministro, Cana Brava, Cachaça do Piloto.  There were two bank branches in 2007.

The municipality still has a relatively unspoilt nature with some forest growth along the rivers.  In recent years several rural hotels (‘hotéis-fazendas’) have opened up near the town offering what is known as eco-tourism to the urban inhabitants of Brasília. This activity supports more than 200 families.

Recently a beer brewery was established in the municipality providing needed jobs and giving the region the possibility of finally developing and benefiting from a higher standard of living.  In the Seplan list of municipal development, which ranked 58 municipalities in the state based on dynamism, economic wealth, quality of life and other factors, Alexânia went from 51st place in 2003 to 18th place in 2004.
Motor vehicles
Automobiles: 2,510
Pickup trucks: 233
Number of inhabitants per motor vehicle: 7.3

Agricultural data 2006
Farms:  638
Total area:  31,901 ha.
Area of permanent crops: 718 ha.
Area of perennial crops: 3,820 ha.
Area of pasture:  26,571 ha.
Area of woodland and forests:  6,495 ha.
Cattle herd: 39,559

Main crops in hectares
Rice: 60
Banana: 250
Sugarcane: 200
Oranges: 9
Lemons: 12
Passion fruit: 35
Corn: 1,800
Soybeans: 3,160
Tangerines: 10
Tomatoes: 40 (All data are from 2006)

Health and education
Schools:  27 (2006)
Enrollment: 6,912
Hospitals: 1 with 46 beds
Literacy rate in 2000:  84.3%
Infant mortality rate in 2000: 36.16
MHDI:  0.696
State ranking: 211 (out of 242 municipalities)
National ranking: 3,056 (out of 5,505 municipalities)

History
The establishment of Alexânia is connected to the construction of Brasília and the Federal District.  In 1957 Alex Abdallah, the owner of the land, created the first lots on the edge of Highway 101, between Anápolis and the new capital.  These lots were distributed to the population without cost.  From the beginning the settlement was officially called Alexânia, honoring its founder.

At first Alexânia was only a "povoado" belonging to the municipality of Corumbá de Goiás.  In 1959 it became part of a new municipality called Olhos d'Água, which had been created in 1956.  In 1961 the growth of the new settlement caused the municipal seat to be moved to Alexânia, with the name remaining Olhos d'Água.  In 1963 Olhos d'Água was renamed Alexânia.

Extraterrestrial contacts
Alexânia's main claim to fame is that there was supposedly an important UFO sighting nearby.  According to witnesses, including a general in the Brazilian army, Moacir Uchoa, who had been professor of Mechanical engineering at the Brazilian military academy and went on to found a private university in Brasília called CEUB, investigators maintained contact with the extraterrestrial beings for ten months during 1969.  General Uchoa died on March 5, 1996, six weeks before his ninetieth birthday.

See also
 List of municipalities in Goiás
Microregions of Goiás

Notes

References

External links
 .
 City Brazil

Municipalities in Goiás